The following is a list of United States ambassadors, or other chiefs of mission, to Nicaragua. The title given by the United States State Department to this position is currently Ambassador Extraordinary and Plenipotentiary.

Ambassadors

Notes

See also
Embassy of the United States, Chișinău
Nicaragua – United States relations
Foreign relations of Nicaragua
Ambassadors of the United States

References
United States Department of State: Background notes on Nicaragua

External links
 United States Department of State: Chiefs of Mission for Nicaragua
 United States Department of State: Nicaragua
 United States Embassy in Managua

Nicaragua
Main
United States